Aleksei Anatolyevich Klestov (born 27 August 1974) is a former Russian football player.

References

1974 births
Footballers from Yaroslavl
Living people
Russian footballers
FC Shinnik Yaroslavl players
Russian Premier League players
FC Tyumen players
FC Dynamo Stavropol players
FC Kristall Smolensk players
Association football defenders
FC Lukhovitsy players